Nathaniel Donnell Abraham (born October 8, 1973) is an American football coach and former cornerback who is the current Defensive Coordinator for St. Louis Battlehawks. In his career, he played for the Tampa Bay Buccaneers (1996–2001) and the New York Jets (2002–2004).

Life after football
After considering retirement since the 2004 season ended, he finally decided to do so on July 15, 2005. Although he had two restaurant businesses going in South Carolina, Abrahams was searching for a post-playing occupation, and during his playing years he swore to himself that he would never become a coach.  However, while on the sidelines of his oldest son’s youth football practice, a local high school coach, whose son played on the same team as Abraham’s, approached him about helping out his team. Before long, Abraham became the head coach at Gibbs High School in St. Petersburg.

Abraham guided Gibbs to its first district title in 2009 but resigned after a 3–7 season in 2010. He was defensive backs coordinator (2011–2012) at Tampa Bay Storm and later (2012) at East Lake High School. In 2013, he was the head coach of the Clearwater High School football team and resigned in 2015. He was (2015–2017) the defensive coordinator at IMG Academy, in Bradenton, Florida. On February 15, 2017, he was named defensive assistant coach for the Illinois Fighting Illini football, joining Head Coach Lovie Smith's coaching team. Abraham left the Illinois program in the summer of 2018.

In November 2018, Abraham joined Steve Spurrier's Orlando Apollos coaching staff as defensive backs coach.

In June 2022, Abraham joined Anthony Becht's coaching staff as the Defensive Coordinator of St. Louis.

References

1973 births
Living people
People from Orangeburg, South Carolina
American football cornerbacks
Players of American football from South Carolina
East Tennessee State Buccaneers football players
National Conference Pro Bowl players
New York Jets players
Tampa Bay Buccaneers players
Tampa Bay Storm coaches
Illinois Fighting Illini football coaches
Orlando Apollos coaches
Orangeburg-Wilkinson High School alumni